The fifth season of the original Mission: Impossible originally aired Saturdays at 7:30–8:30 pm (EST) from September 19, 1970 to March 6, 1971. "The Merchant" originally aired Wednesday, March 17, 1971 at 7:30–8:30 pm (EST).

Cast

Episodes

References

5
1970 American television seasons
1971 American television seasons